Thanamandi is a town and a municipal committee in the Rajouri district in the Indian union territory of Jammu and Kashmir. Thanamandi lies on the Mughal Road between Rajouri and Bufliaz. The municipal area limits are mostly inhabitated by Kashmiris.

Significance
Historically, this route was an important footpath to obtain feed for cattle. The building of the Mughal Road added vehicle traffic bound for Srinagar.

Thanamandi has religious significance as the home of the most important Sufi saint, Baba Ghulam Shah Badshah, whose mausoleum is at Shahdara Sharief in the town.

Thanamandi still has some forts that were built during the time of the Mughals. It may have taken its name from being a trade market ("mandi") during those times.

Demographics

 India census, Thanamandi had a population of 7,204. Males constitute 53% of the population and females 47%; 12% of the population is under 6 years of age. The literacy rate of 60%, higher than the national average of 59.5%: male literacy is 69%, and female literacy is 49%.

Transport

Road
Thanamandi is well-connected by road to other places in Jammu and Kashmir and India by the NH 144A.

Rail
Thanamandi doesn't have its own railway station. The nearest railway station is Jammu Tawi railway station located at a distance of 171 kilometres.

Air
The nearest airport is Jammu Airport located at a distance of 180 kilometres.

See also
 Jammu and Kashmir
 Rajouri
 Sunderbani

References

Cities and towns in Rajouri district